Marist Football Club, formerly known as Marist Fire Football Club, is a Solomon Islands football club based in Honiara.

They were winners of the 2006/2007 Solomon Islands National Club Championship.

They qualified for the Oceania Club Championship 2006 hosted in Auckland, New Zealand which took place in May 2006. Marist F.C. were eliminated in the opening group stage of the tournament, losing 10–1 in their opening match to eventual finalists, AS Pirae of Tahiti, before losing another and winning one.

Titles
 Telekom S-League
Champions (3): 2006, 2009, 2016

Performance in OFC competitions
 OFC Champions League: 3 appearances
Best: 2nd in Group D 2017
2007: 3rd in Group B
2010: 4th in Group B
2017: 2nd in Group D
 Oceania Club Championship: 1 appearance
Best:
2006:

Current squad
Squad for the 2018/19 S-League

Current technical staff

References

External links
 2006 Oceania Club Championship Preview on fifa.com

 
Football clubs in the Solomon Islands
Honiara